Colorado Native Amber Lager is a 5.5% abv amber lager introduced in April 2010 by AC Golden Brewing Company, a subsidiary of Molson Coors. The beer was originally brewed in a 30-barrel brew house located inside the Coors Brewery in Golden, CO.  Colorado Native Lagers are the only lagers brewed with Rocky Mountain water, Colorado-grown hops, Colorado-grown barley from the San Luis Valley and the oldest strain of brewer's yeast in Colorado. The beer is available only in Colorado.
Brand Facts
ETOH:              5.5% ABV, 
IBUs:              38,
Calories:          170 per 12 ounce serving,
Beginning gravity: 12.5 Plato,   
Ending gravity:    2.3 Plato, 
Yeast:            Bottom-fermenting Lager Yeast, 
Bittering hops:   Cascade, Chinook, Centennial,
Finishing hops:   Cascade, Centennial, 
Malts:            Two-row Colorado Moravian Pale & Caramel,

American beer brands